Lazarov (Cyrillic: Лазаров) is  common Bulgarian family name. Variants of the name include Lazarof and Lazaroff. The family name is derived from the personal name Лазар Lazar, "Lazarus".

The following people share this surname:

 Alexandar Lazarov (born 1997), Bulgarian tennis player
 Jorge Lazaroff (1950–1989), Uruguayan composer of paternal Bulgarian origin
 Henri Lazarof (1932–2013), Bulgarian composer
 Kiril Lazarov (born 1980), Macedonian handball player
 Lydia Lazarov (born 1946), Israeli yachting world champion 
 Mihail Lazarov (born 1980), Bulgarian footballer
 Nikola Lazarov (1870–1942), Bulgarian architect
 Petar Lazarov (born 1985), Bulgarian footballer
 Peter Lazarov (born 1958), Bulgarian-Dutch artist printmaker
 Shimon Lazaroff (born 1942), Chassidic Rabbi in Texas 
 Yehezkel Lazarov (born 1974), Israeli actor of paternal Bulgarian origin
 Zdravko Lazarov (born 1976), Bulgarian footballer

Surnames
Bulgarian-language surnames